The Tennis de la Vall d'Hebron is a sports venue located in the Horta-Guinardó district of Barcelona. Modified in 1991, it used only nine of the 17 courts for the tennis competitions of the 1992 Summer Olympics.

References
1992 Summer Olympics official report. Volume 2. pp. 246–9.

Buildings and structures completed in 1991
Venues of the 1992 Summer Olympics
Olympic tennis venues
Vall Hebron
Sports venues in Barcelona
1991 establishments in Spain